The Group 5A South Region is a division of the Virginia High School League. Along with the 5A North Region, it consists of the second largest high schools in Virginia in terms of population. The region was formed in 2013 when the VHSL adopted a six classification format and eliminated the previous three classification system. For the purpose of regular season competition, schools compete within districts that existed prior to 2013, while post-season competition will be organized within four conferences that make up each region.

Conferences for 2013–14 and 2014–15

Atlantic Conference 9
Green Run High School of Virginia Beach
Floyd E. Kellam High School of Virginia Beach
Kempsville High School of Virginia Beach
Princess Anne High School of Virginia Beach
Salem High School of Virginia Beach
Maury High School of Norfolk
Norview High School of Norfolk

PenSouth Conference 10
Gloucester High School of Gloucester
Hampton High School of Hampton
Menchville High School of Newport News
Warwick High School of Newport News
Great Bridge High School of Chesapeake
Hickory High School of Chesapeake
Indian River High School of Chesapeake

Conference 11
Atlee High School of Mechanicsville
Henrico High School of Henrico
Highland Springs High School of Highland Springs
Mechanicsville High School of Mechanicsville
Deep Run High School of Glen Allen
Douglas S. Freeman High School of Henrico
Mills E. Godwin High School of Henrico
Hermitage High School of Henrico

Conference 12
Matoaca High School of Chesterfield
Meadowbrook High School of Chesterfield
Prince George High School of Prince George
L. C. Bird High School of Chesterfield
Clover Hill High School of Midlothian
Manchester High School of Midlothian

External links
 VHSL-Reference 
 Virginia High School League

Virginia High School League
High school sports in Virginia